Qasr Ali  is a Syrian village located in Al-Hamraa Nahiyah in Hama District, Hama.  According to the Syria Central Bureau of Statistics (CBS), Qasr Ali had a population of 263 in the 2004 census.

References 

Populated places in Hama District